Sărăteni is a commune in Leova District, Moldova. It is composed of two villages, Sărăteni and Victoria.

References

Communes of Leova District